The 1979–80 season of the Bayernliga, the third tier of the German football league system in the state of Bavaria at the time, was the 35th season of the league.

Overview
The league champions FC Augsburg, winning their second Bayernliga title after 1972–73, were promoted to the 2. Bundesliga Süd and also qualified for the German amateur championship, where the club lost 2–1 in the final to VfB Stuttgart Amateure.

The bottom four clubs were directly relegated, 1979–80 being the last season before the introduction of the relegation/promotion play-off. Of the four clubs VfR Neuburg would never return to the Bayernliga again while FC Vilshofen made a direct return the following season. FC Wacker München, one of the most successful Bayernliga clubs until than, returned to the league in 1982 and FC Bayern Hof, having dropped out of professional football two years earlier, returned in 1983.

Wolfgang Ruhdorfer of FC Augsburg was the top scorer of the league with 27 goals. The 2.735 goals scored per match marked the lowest average in the history of the league and only the second time, after the previous season, that less than three goals were scored per game in a season.

Table
The 1979–80 season saw four new clubs in the league, FC Herzogenaurach, VfB Helmbrechts and TSV Ampfing, all promoted from the Landesliga Bayern, while FC Augsburg had been relegated from the 2. Bundesliga Süd to the league.		

Of the promoted teams FC Herzogenaurach had last played in the Bayernliga in 1977 and VfB Helmbrechts in 1971 while TSV Ampfing made its first appearance. FC Augsburg had last played in the Bayernliga in 1972–73, when the club won the league and earned promotion to the Regionalliga Süd.

References

Sources

External links 
 Official website  of the Bavarian Football Association 

1979-80
3
1979–80 in European third tier association football leagues